The Little Book of Revenge is a Genie nominated French language Canadian film released in 2006.

Plot 
Bernard, an accountant in a jewelry store, plots revenge against his abusive employer, Monsieur Vendôme, with the help of his friend Robert.

Cast 
 Marc Béland : Bernard
 Michel Muller : Robert
 Gabriel Gascon : Vendôme
 Pascale Bussières : Sandrine
 Alice Morel-Michaud : Lili
 Marie-Christine Adam : Damaris

Reaction 
The film earned four Genie Award nominations: Best Achievement in Direction, Best Motion Picture, Best Performance by an Actor in a Supporting Role and for Best Original Screenplay.

External links 
 
 

2006 films
2000s thriller films
Films shot in Montreal
Films directed by Jean-François Pouliot
Canadian crime comedy-drama films
Canadian comedy thriller films
French-language Canadian films
2000s Canadian films